For One More Day is a 2007 television film adaptation of the Mitch Albom's 2006 novel of the same name, which was a New York Times Best Seller. Produced by Oprah Winfrey's Harpo Productions, the film stars Michael Imperioli and Ellen Burstyn as leads. Director Lloyd Kramer also directed the TV film version of Albom's 2003 novel The Five People You Meet in Heaven. Michael Imperioli who also appeared in the previous film, had his son, Vadim, play his younger version in this film.

Nick Lachey performs the song "Ordinary Day" on the soundtrack of the film. The film was first aired by ABC on December 9, 2007.

Plot
The film is the story of a broken-down former baseball player, Charley Benetto (Imperioli), who is now divorced and estranged from his own daughter, on the verge of a suicide who gets to spend one more day with his estranged departed mother (Burstyn), whom he had blamed for leaving his father. Throughout the course of the movie, she takes him to various points in his life and he learns what actually was going on to get a truer picture of his life.

Cast and characters
 Michael Imperioli as Charley Benetto
 Ellen Burstyn as  Pauline (Posey) Benetto
 Scott Cohen as Len Benetto
 Samantha Mathis as Young Pauline 'Posey' Benetto
 Sara Jerez as Gianna Benetto
 Vadim Imperioli as Young Charley 'Chick' Benetto
 Jaclyn Tommer as Roberta Benetto
 Alice Drummond as Rose
 Emily Wickersham as Maria

Crew
 Casting: Sheila Jaffe	 	
 Production Design: Clark Hunter	 	
 Art Direction: Hinju Kim, Fredda Slavin	 	
 Set Decoration: Traci Kirschbaum	 	
 Costume Design: Juliet Polcsa

Production
The film was shot extensively at Bridgeport, Connecticut, New York, and at two locations in the Fairfield University campus including the Loyola Hall. The Sopranos makeup artist Stephen Kelley helped Imperioli, who was in his early 30s at the time, portray the character from age 20 into his 50s.

Awards and nominations
 2007: Satellite Awards
 Best Television Film (won)
 Best Actress – Miniseries or Television Film: Ellen Burstyn (nominated)
 2007: Directors Guild of America Awards
 Miniseries or TV Film: Lloyd Kramer (nominated)
 2008: 14th Screen Actors Guild Awards
 Outstanding Performance by a Female Actor in Television Movie or Miniseries: Ellen Burstyn: (nominated)

References

External links
 
 

Oprah Winfrey
American television films
Films set in the 20th century
Television shows based on American novels
2007 television films
2007 films
Films shot in Connecticut
Harpo Productions films
Films based on works by Mitch Albom
Films directed by Lloyd Kramer
Films scored by Lennie Niehaus
2000s English-language films